William Graves "Lena" Styles (November 27, 1899 – March 14, 1956) was an American former professional baseball catcher. He played in Major League Baseball over parts of five seasons (1919–21, 1930–31) with the Philadelphia Athletics and Cincinnati Reds. For his career, he compiled a .250 batting average in 176 at-bats and drove in 16 runs.

An alumnus of the University of Alabama, he was born in Gurley, Alabama, and died in Huntsville, Alabama, at the age of 56.

References

External links

1899 births
1956 deaths
Philadelphia Athletics players
Cincinnati Reds players
Major League Baseball catchers
Baseball players from Alabama
People from Madison County, Alabama
Atlanta Crackers players
Baltimore Orioles (IL) players
Newark Bears (IL) players
Toronto Maple Leafs (International League) players
Providence Grays (minor league) players
Reading Keystones players
Dallas Steers players
Little Rock Travelers players
Pine Bluff Judges players
Greenville Bucks players
Anniston Rams players
Alabama Crimson Tide baseball players